Nanocochlea pupoidea is a species of minute freshwater snail with a gill and an operculum, an aquatic gastropod mollusk in the family Hydrobiidae. This species is endemic to Australia.

References

Gastropods of Australia
Nanocochlea
Vulnerable fauna of Australia
Gastropods described in 1993
Taxonomy articles created by Polbot